The Kiev Restaurant (also known as the Kiev Diner or simply The Kiev) was a Ukrainian restaurant located in the East Village section of New York City.

Founded in 1978 by Michael Hrynenko (1954–2004), the site was the former location of Louis Auster's Candy Shop, who was one of the original creators of the egg cream.  

Kiev for most of its existence was open for business 24 hours a day, 7 days a week. It was located at 117 Second Avenue, on the southwest corner of the intersection of Second Avenue and Seventh Street. At one time, the area was known as the "Pierogi Belt" because of the large number of Ukrainian restaurants;  by 2007, only a few remained, such as Veselka. Kiev was popular for Ukrainians who attended St. George's Church down the street, who would go out for brunch after service at Kiev. In its original form, Kiev was closed in 2000 by its owner. It then went through several abortive remodelings and reopenings, closing for good in 2006. 

The cuisine was largely Eastern European, including pierogi, challah, matzah brei, kasha varnishkis (kasha over bow-tie pasta), blintzes, fruit compote and so on, though typically American items such as french fries were also available.

The restaurant was a local cultural institution, famed not only for its cuisine and perpetual availability but also for the eclectic and colorful variety of patrons. It is mentioned in the song "Detachable Penis" by the band King Missile. Poets Allen Ginsberg and Ted Berrigan included the Kiev in poems. The restaurant had many other notable regulars during its tenure.

See also
 List of Ukrainian restaurants
 Veselka

References

External links 
 "Like a Phoenix, Rising From the Ukraine", an account of the 2001 reopening
 "Blinking at the Kiev" , an account from the final incarnation of the restaurant, written in early 2005
 RIP: Leshko's and Kiev, an article about the loss of Slavic flavor after renovation.
 The Kiev: Makes Me Wanna Challah A recounting of changes to the restaurant, and its food.

Defunct restaurants in New York City
Ukrainian-American culture in New York City
Ukrainian restaurants
Restaurants in Manhattan
History of immigration to the United States
Restaurants established in 1978
Restaurants disestablished in 2006
2006 disestablishments in New York (state)
1978 establishments in New York City